Bucculatrix facilis is a moth in the  family Bucculatricidae. It was described by Edward Meyrick in 1911. It is found in Namibia and South Africa.

References

External links
Natural History Museum Lepidoptera generic names catalog

Bucculatricidae
Moths described in 1911
Taxa named by Edward Meyrick
Moths of Africa